The Fifield Fire Lookout Tower is located in the Chequamegon-Nicolet National Forest in Fifield, Wisconsin. It was added to the National Register of Historic Places in 2007.

History
The tower was constructed and originally used by the Wisconsin Conservation Commission. In 1935, the United States Forest Service assumed control and operations of it. The tower remained in use until 1973.

References

Fire lookout towers in Wisconsin
Fire lookout towers on the National Register of Historic Places
Park buildings and structures on the National Register of Historic Places in Wisconsin
Towers completed in 1932
Buildings and structures in Price County, Wisconsin
National Register of Historic Places in Price County, Wisconsin